Parch may refer to:
 Parch, Mazandaran
 Parch, Razavi Khorasan
 Parch, West Azerbaijan